The elm cultivar Ulmus 'Turkestanica' was first described by Regel as U. turkestanica in Dieck, Hauptcat. Baumschul. Zöschen (1883) and in Gartenflora (1884). Regel himself stressed that "U. turkestanica was only a preliminary name given by me; I regard this as a form of U. suberosa" [:U. minor ]. Litvinov (Schedae ad Herbarium Florae Rossicae, 1908) considered U. turkestanica Regel a variety of his U. densa (now considered in Russia a form of field elm), adding that its fruits were "like those of U. foliacea Gilibert" [:U. minor].

'Turkestanica' was distributed in Europe as U. turkestanica Regel by the Späth nursery of Berlin from c.1890, in whose catalogues it was listed separately from U. pinnato-ramosa, now U. pumila 'Pinnato-ramosa', and from U. campestris umbraculifera, with both of which it was later confused – the former by Elwes and Henry, the latter (as U. 'Turkestanica') by Green.

Description
Späth in his catalogues described U. turkestanica Regel as "a densely growing, small-leaved tree". Litvinov (1908) noted that it had branchlets like those of Ulmus pumila but typical field-elm fruit, up to 2 cm long by 1.2 cm wide. Melville noted (1958) that the specimen of U. turkestanica at Kew had "frond-like leading shoots".

Pests and diseases
Not known.

Cultivation
One tree was planted as  U. turkestanica Regel, 'Turkestan Elm', in 1899 at the Dominion Arboretum, Ottawa, Canada, where it was distinguished from U. pinnato-ramosa. A specimen of U. turkestanica Regel was present at Kew from the early 20th century to at least the 1950s, again distinguished from U. pinnato-ramosa. Three U. turkestanica Regel (as well as three 'Pinnato-ramosa') were supplied in 1902 by Späth to the Royal Botanic Garden Edinburgh. One was planted at the Benmore garden in Argyll in 1902, and survives (2020) as a sucker or cutting of the original. Following Green's confusion of 'Turkestanica' and 'Umbraculifera', the Benmore tree was believed for a time to be 'Umbraculifera'. 'Umbraculifera', however,  though present in Späth's catalogues, does not appear in the RBGE 1902 accessions list from Späth. Being grafted, it does not sucker. In 2004 the tree was again misidentified by the Garden as U. pumila L. var. arborea Litv. (a synonym of 'Pinnato-ramosa'), though the leaves do not match those of the latter cultivar. Its original name was restored in 2020. An U. turkestanica stood till 1993 in  RBGE itself, near the U. pinnato-ramosa. This was also a small tree; it produced suckers, and may itself have been sucker regrowth from tree C2697, one of the 1902 'Turkestanica' Regel from Späth. A specimen of 'Turkestanica' Regel stood in the Arboretum national des Barres, Nogent-sur-Vernisson, France, in the 20th century, where it was distinguished from 'Pinnato-ramosa'. It was listed there under the queried synonym of Ulmus campestris turkestanica, suggesting that the Arboretum thought it possibly a field elm cultivar. 

A 'Turkestanica' obtained from Späth before 1914, and planted in 1916, stood in the Ryston Hall arboretum, Norfolk, in the early 20th century. (The arboretum's list includes 'Umbraculifera' but not 'Pinnato-ramosa'.) A 'Turkestanica' (listed separately from 'Umbraculifera'), "a compact grower with smallish leaves", appeared in early 20th-century catalogues of the Gembrook or Nobelius Nursery near Melbourne, Australia. The description is the one used by Späth for U. turkestanica Regel. 'Pinnato-ramosa' (not in the Nobelius catalogue) is, by contrast, a rather loosely-branched tree, so the Nobelius introduction may have been Regel's tree. 

By the 1930s, when 'Pinnato-ramosa' was being recommended as resistant to early-strain Dutch elm disease, the "Turkestan elm" in nursery lists, as descriptions show, was usually the Siberian elm cultivar, not Regel's tree. The Hesse Nursery of Weener, Germany, sold an "Ulmus turkestanica Reg." in the 1930s, but gave U. pumila arborea Litv., another name for 'Pinnato-ramosa', as a synonym.

Putative specimens
A tall suckering field elm with leaves closely matching those of the Benmore specimen, and with the "frond-like leading shoots" described by Melville, stands in Carlton Terrace Gardens, Edinburgh, above Carlton Terrace Brae.

Synonymy
 Ulmus suberosa var. turkestanica
 Ulmus campestris turkestanica (?)
 Ulmus campestris var. laevis Regel (1879) (Litvinov, 1908)

Accessions

Europe
Royal Botanic Garden Benmore, UK, as U. turkestanica Regel, Acc. no. 19021007

North America
Dominion Arboretum, Ottawa, Ontario, Canada. Accession no. 2626

References

External links
  Labelled U. turkestanica Regel, from Späth; The Hague specimen (1931)
  Labelled U. turkestanica Regel, from Späth; Kew Gardens specimen, long shoot
  Labelled U. turkestanica, from Späth (1902); RBG Edinburgh specimen (1959)  
  Labelled U. turkestanica, from Späth (1902); RBG Edinburgh specimen (1959)
  Ulmus, formerly labelled U. turkestanica; Wageningen Arboretum specimen (1929)

Elm cultivars
Ulmus articles missing images
Ulmus
Ulmus Edinburgh Spath 1902